Various English literature university departments or programs are known as the School of English. Articles on such schools include:

School of English (University of Wales, Bangor), UK
Birmingham City University School of English, UK

See also
The English School (disambiguation), various schools